Cyril Théréau (born 24 April 1983) is a French former professional footballer who played as a striker. He represented Orléans and Angers in France, Charleroi (two stints) and Anderlecht in Belgium, Steaua București in Romania, and Chievo, Udinese, Fiorentina and Cagliari in Italy.

Club career

Early career
At senior level, Théréau started playing for Gap FC in the "Honneur régional" league in France's seventh tier.

He joined fourth-tier side US Orléans in 2004 where he scored 12 goals in 10 matches.

Angers
After half a season with Orléans, he moved to Ligue 2-side Angers SCO in the winter transfer period. In his first professional match, a Coupe de France round of 32 tie at Stade Vélodrome on 8 January 2005, he netted the third goal as Angers won 3–2 against Marseille who at the time fielded Fabien Barthez in goal.

In his second season at Angers, with whom he had been relegated to the third-division Championnat National, he attained 8 goals in 29 league matches.

Charleroi
In summer 2006, Théréau joined Charleroi. Having bagged three goals in his first four matches, he left the club in the same transfer period.

Steaua
On 29 August 2006, Théréau signed a four-year contract with Steaua București. The reported transfer fee paid to Charleroi was €1 million while Théréau's salary multiplied by seven to about €240,000 annually. The move happened after the Steaua's coach saw him play against Standard Liège and thought he could make a good replacement for the injured Victoraș Iacob. Months after playing in the Championnat National for Angers, Théréau made an appearance in the Champions League being substituted on in the 70th minute in Steaua's 1–4 win away to Dynamo Kyiv on 13 September 2006. He was used in all six matches in the group stage without scoring as Steaua failed to progress from the group which also included Real Madrid and Lyon. He scored his first hat-trick for Steaua in a win against FC Naţional in the Romanian top division on 12 November 2006. Théréau became a fan favourite at the club and this did not change when he was sent off in the Bucharest derby against Dinamo. In total, he amassed 10 goals in 17 leagues games.

Anderlecht
On 26 June 2007, Théréau agreed to a four-year deal with Belgian champions R.S.C. Anderlecht for a transfer fee of about €3 million.

Return to Charleroi
He returned to Charleroi on 14 January 2008, initially on loan. On 29 February 2008, he struck a brace against title contenders Club Brugge.

Charleroi secured Théréau's services permanently on 9 June 2008 on a three-year contract. On 10 March 2010, he reached a hat-trick in a 4–1 defeat of relegation rivals Lokeren – his club's first win of the year – which all but guaranteed Charleroi's Belgian Pro league status.

Chievo
On 24 August 2010, Théréau signed for Chievo Verona in the Italian Serie A. In October 2010, he scored his first goal against Cesena.

By the end of his spell with Chievo, having spent four seasons there, he had made 129 appearances in all competitions for the club and with 26 league goals he was the Chievo's most prolific foreign goalscorer of all time.

Udinese
During the 2014 summer transfer window, Théréau signed for Udinese Calcio on an annual salary of €700,000. In his first season, he scored 10 goals.

On 23 August 2015, he scored the decisive goal as Udinese beat Juventus 1–0. It was the first time in history Juventus lost on their home debut. He completed the 2015–16 season scoring 11 goals and contributing three assists in 36 league matches for his club.

Fiorentina
On 31 August 2017, Théréau signed a new contract with another Serie A club Fiorentina, after three years with Udinese.

Cagliari loan
On 31 January 2019, Théréau joined Cagliari on loan until 30 June 2019.

Style of play

Théréau is a skillful striker, who can score from practically every position. He reached fame in Belgium when he scored a goal after dribbling from the middle of the pitch to the penalty box. Although he is very tall, he has good ball shooting skills and is a technical player.

Career statistics

References

External links
 
 
 
 

1983 births
Living people
People from Privas
Sportspeople from Ardèche
French footballers
Footballers from Auvergne-Rhône-Alpes
Association football forwards
Ligue 2 players
Belgian Pro League players
Liga I players
Serie A players
Angers SCO players
FC Steaua București players
R.S.C. Anderlecht players
A.C. ChievoVerona players
Udinese Calcio players
ACF Fiorentina players
Cagliari Calcio players
French expatriate footballers
French expatriate sportspeople in Belgium
Expatriate footballers in Belgium
French expatriate sportspeople in Romania
Expatriate footballers in Romania
French expatriate sportspeople in Italy
Expatriate footballers in Italy